Drostdy Museum  is located in  Swellendam, South Africa.The building was built in 1747 by the Dutch East India Company as a residence for the Magistrate. Soon afterwards, a jail, a house for the secretary, a mill and various outbuildings were erected.
It was bought by the South African Government and established as a Museum in 1939.

References

External links

Art museums and galleries in South Africa
Museums established in 1939
1939 establishments in South Africa
Buildings and structures completed in 1747
18th-century architecture in South Africa